The 1963 World Table Tennis Championships men's singles was the 27th edition of the men's singles championship. 

Chuang Tse-Tung defeated Li Fu-Jung in the final, winning three sets to one to secure the title.

Results

See also
List of World Table Tennis Championships medalists

References

-